There have been three baronetcies created for members of the Grey family, one in the Baronetage of England, one in the Baronetage of Great Britain and one in the Baronetage of the United Kingdom. Two of the creations are extant as of 2007.

The Grey Baronetcy, of Chillingham in the County of Northumberland, was created in the Baronetage of England on 15 June 1619 for William Grey. For more information on this creation, see Baron Grey of Werke.

The Grey Baronetcy, of Howick in the County of Northumberland, was created in the Baronetage of Great Britain on 11 January 1746 for Henry Grey. He was a descendant of an uncle of the first Baronet of the 1619 creation. Henry Grey's third son, the third Baronet, had already been created Earl Grey when he succeeded his elder brother in 1808. For more information on the baronetcy, see this title.

The Grey Baronetcy, of Fallodon in the County of Northumberland, was created in the Baronetage of the United Kingdom on 29 July 1814 for the Hon. George Grey, Captain R.N., 1767–1828, Commissioner of Portsmouth Dockyard. He was the third son of the first Earl Grey. His son, the second Baronet, and great-grandson, the third Baronet, were both prominent Liberal politicians. The latter was raised to the Peerage of the United Kingdom as Viscount Grey of Fallodon, in the County of Northumberland, in 1916. However, this title became extinct on his death in 1933.

Grey baronets, of Chillingham (1619)
see Baron Grey of Werke

Grey baronets, of Howick (1746)
see Earl Grey

Grey baronets, of Fallodon (1814)
Sir George Grey, 1st Baronet (1767–1828)
Sir George Grey, 2nd Baronet (1799–1882)
George Henry Grey (1835–1874)
Sir Edward Grey, 3rd Baronet (1862–1933) (created Viscount Grey of Fallodon in 1916)

Viscounts Grey of Fallodon (1916)
Edward Grey, 1st Viscount Grey of Fallodon (1862–1933)

Grey baronets, of Fallodon (1814; reverted)
 Sir Charles George Grey, 4th Baronet (1880–1957), he died sine prole, the title passed to his brother
 Sir Harry Martin Grey, 5th Baronet (1882–1960), he died sine prole, the title passed to his cousin
 Sir Robin Edward Dysart Grey, 6th Baronet (1886–1974), had issue and was succeeded by his eldest grandson
 Sir Anthony Dysart Grey, 7th Baronet (born 1949)

The heir is the present holder's son, Thomas Jasper Grey (born 1998).

See also
 Lambert baronets, who bore the surname Grey from 1905 to 1938

Notes

Bibliography 
 
 

 
 

Baronetcies in the Baronetage of Great Britain
Baronetcies in the Baronetage of the United Kingdom
Extinct baronetcies in the Baronetage of England
1619 establishments in England
1746 establishments in Great Britain
1814 establishments in the United Kingdom